Shannon Garrett (born January 24, 1972) is a former professional Canadian football defensive back and linebacker who played fourteen seasons in the Canadian Football League.

Early years 
Garrett was born January 24, 1972, in Bay St. Louis, Mississippi. He was a four-year college football starter at Mississippi College and was nominated as an All-American, All-Gulf South Conference (GSC) and ALL-GSC Academic. He was inducted into the Mississippi College Hall of Fame in April 2008.

Professional career 
Garrett began his pro career with the Winnipeg Blue Bombers in the 1995 CFL season and played three seasons there before moving on to the Saskatchewan Roughriders for the 1998 and 1999 CFL seasons. After being released following a training camp try-out with the New Orleans Saints of the National Football League in 2000, Garrett joined the Edmonton Eskimos in September of the 2000 CFL season and remained with the organisation until his retirement in March 2009.

References

External links 
 Edmonton Eskimos bio

1972 births
Living people
American players of Canadian football
Canadian football defensive backs
Canadian football linebackers
Edmonton Elks players
Mississippi College Choctaws football players
Saskatchewan Roughriders players
Winnipeg Blue Bombers players